Troubled Paradise is the debut studio album by American singer Slayyyter. It was released on June 11, 2021 by Fader Label. It received generally positive reviews from music critics, who praised the updated production, lyricism and maturity in songwriting. Some critics deemed this album was an improvement from her debut mixtape.

Background and development 
In September 2019, after releasing a string of singles and having achieved a moderate success with tracks on TikTok, as well as ascending in social media as an emerging star in niches such as hyperpop and the Stan Twitter community, Slayyyter released her eponymous debut mixtape. A month before its release, the artist answered some online questions regarding the mixtape. In response to a fan asking if rock would be present on the mixtape, she replied that she would be "saving this style for S2", presumably referring to her then-upcoming debut studio album. Later, Slayyyter did indeed work with the genre in some of the Troubled Paradise tracks. 

In September 2019, a few days before the release of Slayyyter, the singer was questioned on Twitter about a popular unreleased track among fans she had mentioned and played before, "Doghouse" (later, "Dog House"). The answer was "yes :} will be finished for s1 deluxe edition". Months after that, she continued to tease fans with a taste of what was coming, having teased "Doghouse" almost in full while livestreaming on Instagram. Some other rumors also started spreading about what songs would be included in Slayyyter's next record. Known tracks at the time (late 2019 and early 2020) were "Talk to Me", "ID", "Dangerous", "Villain" and "Heaven". None of those tracks, with the exception of "Villain" and "Dog House", were added to the final tracklist of Troubled Paradise. It is also worth noting that since the release of her first demos on SoundCloud, around 2018, the release of her debut mixtape and Mini Tour in 2019, until the release of Troubled Paradise in 2021, Slayyyter gained enough popularity to obtain a loyal fanbase.

The production of Troubled Paradise has its roots back in Slayyyter's Mini Tour (2019), when she teased fans saying the album would be "much better" than her debut mixtape and that they would love it. In early 2020, the singer traveled to L.A. to work on the record. She ended up staying there, while many recording studios shuttered and halted music production. “A lot of people were, like ‘I can’t make songs right now ’cause I can’t get to the studio [...] And I was like, ‘[That] sucks. I’m fine. I know how to do it.’”, she says. Regarding the production of Troubled Paradise, she stated in interviews that its sound would be cleaner than her previous record, as she realized many fans were criticizing the mixing of Slayyyter. "It isn't bedroom pop", says the artist.

Singles and promotion 
On October 21, 2020, "Self Destruct" was released as the album's lead single, accompanied by the release of its music video hours later. The music video was directed by Brent McKeever. The album's title, Troubled Paradise, and tracklist (although out of order) were leaked on Last.fm.

"Throatzillaaa" was released as the second single on November 13, 2020. A lyric video was made available on November 9 before the official announcement on November 11. In December, the title track "Troubled Paradise" was registered on Slayyyter's ASCAP. before being officially announced on January 19, 2021. "Troubled Paradise" and its music video, directed by Munachi Osegbu and produced by Collin Druz, were released on January 22. The song was leaked in full the day before, as well as the album's final tracklist, cover art and the "Troubled Paradise" music video.

On January 21, 2021, one day before planned, Slayyyter announced the official album title as Troubled Paradise on social media, along with its official art cover and release date of June 11, 2021. The day after, the tracklist and pre-sale were made available.

"Clouds" was released as the next single on February 26, 2021, followed by "Cowboys" on April 9 and "Over This!" on May 7.

Track listing

Personnel
 John Greenham – mastering
 Wuki – mixing, recording (1)
 Rob Kinelski – mixing (2, 5–12)
 Ike Schultz – mixing (3, 4)
 Robokid – recording (2, 4–6)
 Gupi – recording (3)
 John Hill – recording (6)
 Jordan Palmer – recording (6)
 Schmarx – recording (7)
 Nicopop – recording (7)
 Dave Burris – recording (8)
 Micah Jasper – recording (8)
 Lauren D'Elia – recording (9)
 Pilotpriest – recording (9)
 Chris Greatti – recording (10, 11)
 Zakk Cervini – recording (10, 11)
 Kyle Shearer – recording (12)
 Nate Campany – recording (12)

References

External links 
 slayyyter at slayyyter.com
 Slayyyter - Troubled Paradise at discogs.com

2021 debut albums
Slayyyter albums